Death Is a Number is a 1951 British horror film directed by Robert Henryson and starring Terence Alexander, Lesley Osmond and Peter Gawthorne.

Plot
A racing driver is persecuted by the number 9.

Cast
 Terence Alexander - Alan Robert  
  Lesley Osmond - Joan Robert  
  Peter Gawthorne - James Gregson  
  Denis Webb - John Bridgnorth  
  Isabel George - Nurse  
  Ingeborg von Kusserow - Gipsy

Critical reception
TV Guide rated the film two out of five stars, noting an "Okay, if forgotten, melodrama."

References

External links
 

1951 films
1951 horror films
British horror films
British black-and-white films
1950s English-language films
1950s British films